O'Shaughnessy Stadium is a multi-purpose stadium in St. Paul, Minnesota. It is the home of the St. Thomas Tommies football and track and field teams, in addition to various intramural sports. The stadium opened in 1948 and is named for Ignatius O'Shaughnessy, an alumnus of St. Thomas and a donor to the school.

The stadium was most recently renovated in 2017 with the addition of a new field turf surface and track surface. The seating capacity of the stadium is 5,025, though its record attendance was 12,483, achieved on September 14, 2014 during a football game against Saint John's.

References

Sports venues in Minnesota
Multi-purpose stadiums in the United States
University of St. Thomas (Minnesota)
1948 establishments in Minnesota
Sports venues completed in 1948